Akiba-Schechter Jewish Day School is a Jewish day school in Chicago's Hyde Park neighborhood. It is the only Jewish school on Chicago's South Side and attracts a wide range of students from across the Chicago metropolitan area.

History
The school came into existence in 1972 through the merger of an Orthodox-affiliated school, Akiba South Side Jewish Day School (founded in 1949), and a school affiliated with the Conservative movement, Solomon Schechter South Side School (founded in 1965). Since the merger, Akiba-Schechter has been run under the auspices of both the Associated Talmud Torahs (Orthodox), the Board of Jewish Education (Community), and now the Jewish United Fund of Chicago. Since 2017, Akiba-Schechter has been under the leadership of Dr. Eliezer Jones, as its seventh Head of School.

Pre-school
The Pre-school was founded in 1982, and has since become a highly renowned pre-school and continues to grow.  Barbara Simon, the pre-school's first director, continues to teach, although the pre-school has been under the leadership of Carla Goldberg, a Kohl McCormick Early Childhood Teaching Award winner in 2000.  Akiba-Schechter's Pre-School and Kindergarten is a NAEYC (National Association for the Education of Young Children) accredited program. The Preschool is most well known for its play-based and Reggio Emilia-inspired curriculum. It, unlike the Grade School, is open to all faiths, and the diversity of its population reflects this.

Recent changes

In 1998, the School purchased from Congregation Rodfei Zedek two buildings in which it had operated since 1972 - Hoffman House (home to the elementary school) and a 1965 building, used for the pre-school. In 2005, Hoffman House was replaced by a new elementary school building designed by architect John Ronan.  Ronan has received numerous prestigious awards for the new building, including an award from the Chicago Architecture Foundation.

During the summer of 2007, a major renovation of the original 1965 building was undertaken, including upgrades of the heating, cooling, plumbing, and electrical systems, and installation of modern exterior windows.  The second phase of the renovation is planned and will include interior finishes, a renovated administrative office suite that features a new Teacher Resource Library and the renovation and expansion of the Pre-School playground.

Notable alumni
 Caroline Glick (1983), Israeli-American journalist
 Miriam Kass (2008 to present), winner of the Steinhart award for Excellent Teaching

Akiba-Schechter has also been honored to send several of its students to national competitions including the National Spelling Bee in Washington D.C., the National Chidon Ha'Tanach Bible competition in New York, the regional science fair, and the state science fair in Champaign-Urbana.

See also 
 History of the Jews in Chicago

References

External links
 Akiba-Schechter Jewish Day School
 Associated Talmud Torahs of Chicago

Conservative Judaism in Illinois
Private elementary schools in Illinois
Educational institutions established in 1972
Modern Orthodox Jewish day schools in the United States
Orthodox Judaism in Chicago
Jewish day schools in Chicago
1972 establishments in Illinois